The following are the basketball events that are expected to take place in 2018 throughout the world.
Tournaments include international (FIBA), professional (club) and amateur and collegiate levels.

International tournaments
Arranged chronologically.

2019 FIBA Basketball World Cup qualification

Professional club seasons

Continental seasons

Men

Women

Regional seasons

Men

Women

Domestic league seasons

Men

Women

Semi-professional

College seasons

Men's

Women's

Deaths
January 2 – Dee Ayuba, 31, British-Nigerian player (Iraklis Thessaloniki).
January 12 – Keith Jackson, 89, American NBA and college announcer
January 13 – Aristeidis Roubanis, 85, Greek player (Panellinios)
January 16 – Jo Jo White, 71, American Hall of Fame NBA player (Boston Celtics) and Olympic Gold Medalist (1968)
January 25 — Bill Logan, 83, American college player (Iowa)
January 30 — Joaquín Rojas, 79, Filipino Olympic player (1968).
January 31 — Rasual Butler, 38, American NBA player.
February 2 — Tomás Gutiérrez, 77, Puerto Rican Olympic player (1964, 1968).
February 9 — Neill McGeachy, 75, American college coach (Duke).
February 13 — Danko Radić, 65, Croatian referee.
February 14 — Don Carter, 84, NBA owner (Dallas Mavericks).
February 24 — Ed Leede, 90, American NBA player (Boston Celtics)
February 25 — Dan Fegan, 56, American agent
February 25 — Danny Florencio, 70, Filipino player (Toyota, Crispa, U/Tex)
March 3 — Sabit Hadžić, 60, Bosnian Olympic Bronze medalist (1984).
March 7 — Woody Durham, 76, American college radio announcer (North Carolina)
March 10 — Gene Rhodes, 90, American NBA player (Indianapolis Olympians) and ABA coach (Kentucky Colonels)
March 12 — Bud Olsen, 77, American NBA player (Cincinnati Royals, San Francisco Warriors, Detroit Pistons).
March 13 — J. L. Parks, 90, American college player (Oklahoma State), two-time national champion (1945, 1946).
March 13 — Henry Williams, 46, American player (Scaligera Verona, Benetton Treviso, Virtus Roma).
March 15 — Tom Benson, 90, American NBA owner (New Orleans Pelicans).
March 15 — Bob Phibbs, 90, Canadian Olympic player (1952).
March 24 — Marco Solfrini, 60, Italian player (Virtus Roma) and Olympic Silver medalist (1980).
March 26 — Zeke Upshaw, 26, American player (Helios Suns, Grand Rapids Drive).
March 28 — Daryl Thomas, 52, American player, national champion at Indiana (1987).
April 2 — Alton Ford, 36, American NBA player (Phoenix Suns, Houston Rockets).
April 2 — Fufi Santori, 85, Puerto Rican Olympic player (1960).
April 8 — Joe McConnell, 79, American NBA, ABA and college radio announcer.
April 8 — Bill Meyer, 74, American ABA player (Pittsburgh Pipers).
April 11 — Mauro Panaggio, 90, American college and CBA coach.
April 14 — Daedra Charles, 49, American WNBA player (Los Angeles Sparks), college national champion (Tennessee) and Olympic bronze medalist (1992).
April 14 — Hal Greer, 81, American Hall of Fame NBA player (Philadelphia 76ers).
April 16 — Vic Bubas, 91, American college coach (Duke).
April 17 — Dick Fichtner, 78, American college coach (Occidental, Pacific).
April 19 — Gil Santos, 80, American NBA (Boston Celtics) and college (Providence) announcer.
April 23 — Bob Schermerhorn, 75, American college coach (Southern Utah, Arizona State).
April 25 — Rolla Anderson, 97, American college coach (Kalamazoo).
April 25 — Alberto Marson, 93, Brazilian Olympic Bronze medalist (1948).
April 25 — Bill Stokes, 89, American college coach (Middle Tennessee).
May 3 — Bob Prewitt, 93, American college coach (SMU).
May 4 — Larry Hunter, 68, American college coach (Wittenberg, Ohio, Western Carolina).
May 10 — Donnie Forman, 92, American BAA player (Minneapolis Lakers).
May 14 — Howard Bayne, 75, American ABA player (Kentucky Colonels).
May 16 — Michael Slive, 77, American college conference commissioner (SEC, Conference USA), chair of 2009 NCAA tournament selection committee.
May 26 — Chipper Harris, 55, American college player (Robert Morris).
May 28 — Cliff Tucker, 29, American player.
June 4 — C. M. Newton, 88, Hall of Fame college coach (Alabama, Vanderbilt) and athletic director (Kentucky).
June 10 — Pavlos Giannakopoulos, 89, Greek administrator (Panathinaikos B.C.).
June 11 — Oscar Furlong, 90, Argentine player and Olympian (1948, 1952).
June 13 — Anne Donovan, 56, American Hall of Fame player (Old Dominion) and coach (Seattle Storm, Seton Hall). Olympic gold medalist (1984, 1988).
June 18 — Kostas Politis, 76, Greek player and coach (Panathinaikos B.C.).
June 19 — Bill Kenville, 87, American NBA player (Syracuse Nationals, Fort Wayne/Detroit Pistons)
June 20 — John Ward, 88, American college broadcaster (Tennessee).
June 23 — Gazmend Sinani, 27, Kosovan player (Fenerbahçe, Sigal Prishtina).
June 30 — Mike Heideman, 70, American college coach (St. Norbert, Green Bay).
July 6 — Clifford Rozier, 45, American player (Golden State Warriors, Toronto Raptors, Minnesota Timberwolves).
July 7 — Tyler Honeycutt, 27, American player (Sacramento Kings, BC Khimki).
July 8 — Billy Knight, 39, American player.
July 8 — Frank Ramsey, 86, American Hall of Fame player (Boston Celtics).
July 8 — Lonnie Shelton, 62, American NBA player (Seattle SuperSonics).
July 9 — Johnny Moates, 73, American college player (Richmond).
July 9 — Finnbjörn Þorvaldsson, Icelandic basketball player (Íþróttafélag Reykjavíkur) and Olympic sprinter.
July 12 — Len Chappell, 77, American NBA player (Philadelphia 76ers, New York Knicks, Milwaukee Bucks).
July 12 — Bud Lathrop, 82, American high school coach.
July 14 — Ron Thomas, 67, American ABA player (Kentucky Colonels).
July 16 — Robin Jones, 64, American NBA player (Portland Trail Blazers, Houston Rockets).
July 16 — Jerzy Piskun, 80, Polish Olympic player (1960, 1964).
July 18 — Czesław Malec, 77, Polish Olympic player (1968).
July 20 — Arvo Jantunen, 89, Finnish player and coach (Tampereen Pyrintö).
July 22 — Rene Portland, 65, American college coach (Saint Joseph's, Colorado, Penn State).
July 26 — John Kline, 87, American player (Harlem Globetrotters).
August 13 — Rico Pontvianne, 74, Mexican Olympic player (1964, 1968).
August 17 — Bob Bass, 89, American college coach and ABA/NBA coach and executive (San Antonio Spurs, Charlotte Hornets).
August 22 — Joey Mente, 42, Filipino player (San Miguel Beermen, Welcoat Dragons).
September 5 — Mike Hogewood, 63, American college basketball broadcaster (Atlantic Coast Conference).
September 6 — Richard DeVos, 92, American NBA owner (Orlando Magic).
September 10 — Michel Bonnevie, 96, French Olympic silver medalist (1948).
September 11 — Don Newman, 60, American college (Sacramento State) and NBA (Milwaukee Bucks, San Antonio Spurs, Washington Wizards) coach.
September 12 — Don Corbett, 75, American college coach (Lincoln, North Carolina A&T).
September 16 — Butch Wade, 73, American college player (Indiana State).
September 19 — Wojciech Myrda, 39, Polish player (Avtodor Saratov, Spišská Nová Ves).
September 22 — Bob Lienhard, 70, American player (Pallacanestro Cantu).
September 25 — Jack McKinney, 83, American college (Saint Joseph's) and NBA (Los Angeles Lakers, Indiana Pacers) coach.
September 27 — Art Williams, 78, American NBA (San Diego Rockets, Boston Celtics) and ABA player (San Diego Conquistadors).
October 4 — Jack Avina, 89, American college coach (Portland).
October 4 — José Lluis, 80, Spanish Olympic player (1960).
October 5 — Grigorij Khizhnyak, 44, Ukrainian player (BC Kyiv, BC Budivelnyk, BC Dynamo Saint Petersburg).
October 6 — Paul James, 87, American college broadcaster (Utah, BYU).
October 6 — George Kaftan, 90, American college All-American (Holy Cross) and NBA player (Boston Celtics, New York Knicks, Baltimore Bullets).
October 10 — Tex Winter, 96, American Hall of Fame college (Kansas State) and NBA (Houston Rockets, Chicago Bulls) coach.
October 14 — Enrique Baliño, 90, Uruguayan Olympic player (1952).
October 14 — Patrick Baumann, 51, Swiss executive (Secretary General of FIBA)
October 14 — Dick Tinkham, American ABA owner (Indiana Pacers) and administrator.
October 15 — Paul Allen, 65, American NBA owner (Portland Trail Blazers).
October 28 — Bill Trumbo, 79, American college coach (Culver–Stockton, Sonoma State, Idaho, Cal State Monterey) and athletic director.
November 7 — Bob Patterson, 86, All-American college player (Tulsa).
November 17 — Gene Berce, 91, American NBL (Oshkosh All-Stars) and BAA (Tri-Cities Blackhawks) player.
November 18 — Waldyr Boccardo, 82, Brazilian Olympic bronze medalist (1960).
November 22 — Willie Naulls, 84, American NBA player (St. Louis Hawks, New York Knicks, Boston Celtics, San Francisco Warriors).
November 24 — Lou Cvijanovich, 92, American high school coach.
November 25 — Tony Hanson, 63, American college player (Connecticut) and professional coach (Tees Valley Mohawks).
November 29 — Ralph Hodge, 65, American college coach (Olivet Nazarene).
December 5 — Gary McPherson, 82, American college coach (VMI, Alderson Broaddus, West Virginia).
December 6 — Willie Murrell, 78, American ABA player (Denver Rockets, Miami Floridians, Kentucky Colonels).
December 9 — Eric Anderson, 48, American college (Indiana) and NBA (New York Knicks) player.
December 9 — Tim Bassett, 67, American ABA player (San Diego Conquistadors, New Jersey Nets, San Antonio Spurs).
December 18 — Raimo Vartia, 81, Finnish Olympic player (1964).
December 19 — Ron Abegglen, 81, American college coach (Weber State).
December 19 — Mel Hutchins, 90, American NBA player (St. Louis Hawks, Fort Wayne Pistons, New York Knicks).
December 23 — Bob Mattick, 85, American college All-American (Oklahoma State).
December 27 — Jim Davis, 77, American NBA player (Atlanta Hawks, Houston Rockets, Detroit Pistons).
December 27 — Bumper Tormohlen, 81, American NBA player and coach (Atlanta Hawks).

See also
 Timeline of women's basketball

References 

 
2018 sport-related lists